Yemen Region also known as South Arabia is a geographic term denoting territories of historic South Arabia which included All lands between the Gulf of Oman in the east and the Red Sea in the west.

In the 20th century, Imam Yahya Muhammad Hamid ed-Din, King of the Mutawakkilite Kingdom of Yemen (North Yemen) attempted to unify Yemen but only managed to consolidate his control in Upper Yemen, Lower Yemen, Marib, and Lower Tihamah.  He expressed his claim to Aden and the Aden Protectorate in treaties, such as in the Italo-Yemeni Treaty of 1926. He was unable to dislodge the British from the Aden hinterland or Hadhramaut. British control of Aden was also challenged by his successor King Ahmad bin Yahya who did not recognise British suzerainty in South Arabia and also had ambitions of creating a unified Greater Yemen.  In the late 1940s and the early 1950s, Yemen was involved in a series of border skirmishes along the disputed Violet Line, a 1913 Anglo-Ottoman demarcation that served to separate Yemen from the Aden Protectorate.

After Aden achieved independence from Britain in the 1960s, it united with North Yemen in 1990 to form the Republic of Yemen, which saw the majority of Greater Yemen ruled as a single polity for the first time in nearly two centuries, but the Southern Movement has since 1994 sought the secession of south Yemen.

See also
 Saudi Arabia–Yemen border
 South Arabia

References

Sources
Negotiating the Saudi-Yemeni international boundary
History of Yemen
Yemen: About The Yemen - Part 1
Yemen's Historical Capital

Historical regions
Historical regions in Saudi Arabia
Yemen
Geography of the Middle East
Politics of Yemen
Divided regions
Arabian Peninsula
South Arabia